Arthur Lees (1874 – death unknown) was an English rugby union and professional rugby league footballer who played in the 1890s and 1900s. Prior to Thursday 29 August 1895, Oldham was a rugby union club.

Background
Arthur Lees was born in Lees, Lancashire, England.

Playing career

Challenge Cup Final appearances
Arthur Lees played , and was captain, in Oldham's 19–9 victory over Hunslet in the 1899 Challenge Cup Final during the 1898–99 season at Fallowfield Stadium, Manchester on Saturday 29 April 1899, in front of a crowd of 15,763, and in the 3–17 defeat by Warrington in the 1906–07 Challenge Cup Final during the 1906–07 season at Wheater's Field, Broughton Saturday 27 April 1907, in front of a crowd of 18,500.

Championship appearances
Arthur Lees played for Oldham in the Championship victory during the 1904–05 season .

Honoured at Oldham
Arthur Lees is an Oldham Hall Of Fame Inductee.

References

External links
 (archived by web.archive.org) Statistics at orl-heritagetrust.org.uk

1874 births
English rugby league players
English rugby union players
Lancashire County RFU players
Lancashire rugby league team players
Oldham R.L.F.C. captains
Oldham R.L.F.C. players
People from Lees, Greater Manchester
Place of death missing
Rugby league five-eighths
Rugby league halfbacks
Rugby league players from Oldham
Rugby union fly-halves
Rugby union players from Oldham
Rugby union scrum-halves
Year of death missing